Egisto Olivieri (1880–1962) was an Italian stage and film actor. He appeared in more than forty films during his career including The Little School Mistress (1934). His final film appearance was in Vittorio De Sica's Miracle in Milan (1951)

Selected filmography
 The Haller Case (1933)
 Everybody's Woman (1934)
 The Little School Mistress (1934)
 Aldebaran (1935)
 Luciano Serra, Pilot (1938)
 The Silent Partner (1939)
 Captain Fracasse (1940)
The King of England Will Not Pay (1941)
 The Mask of Cesare Borgia (1941)
 Carmela (1942)
 Love Story (1942)
 Short Circuit (1943)
 Resurrection (1944)
 The Sun Still Rises (1946)
 Departure at Seven (1946)
 Hand of Death (1949)
 Mistress of the Mountains (1950)
 Songs in the Streets (1950)
 Miracle in Milan (1951)

References

External links 
 

1880 births
1962 deaths
Italian male film actors
Italian male stage actors
Male actors from Rome
20th-century Italian male actors